"I Will Wait for You" is the English version of "Je ne pourrai jamais vivre sans toi", a song from the French musical The Umbrellas of Cherbourg (Les Parapluies de Cherbourg, 1964). Its music was composed by Michel Legrand and the original lyrics were written by Jacques Demy. It was performed in the film by Catherine Deneuve, whose voice was dubbed by Danielle Licari. The English lyrics of the song were written by Norman Gimbel. This version was nominated for the Academy Award for Best Song at the 38th Academy Awards held in 1966. In July of the same year, Connie Francis released an English-language cover of the song on her album Movie Greats of the 60's. The cover by Connie Francis was prominently featured in a 2002 episode of the American television series Futurama titled Jurassic Bark.

References

External links
"I Will Wait for You" at the Internet Movie Database

Songs with music by Michel Legrand
Songs with lyrics by Norman Gimbel
Songs written for films
French songs
French-language songs
1964 songs
Film theme songs